In music, monophony is the simplest of textures, consisting of melody without accompanying harmony.

Monophony or monophonic may also refer to:

Monophony (Russian Orthodox liturgy), consecutive singing of chants one by one, as opposed to simultaneous singing

See also
Monaural, single-channel sound reproduction
Monosynth, a feature of synthesizers